Tonga is represented at the 2006 Commonwealth Games in Melbourne by a xx-member strong contingent comprising 24 sportspersons and xx officials. The Tongan team includes a rugby sevens team, six boxers, three weight lifters and three competitors in athletics.

Medals

External links

Tonga at the Commonwealth Games
Nations at the 2006 Commonwealth Games
Commonwealth Games